"Naturama" is the thirteenth episode of the seventh season of the animated sitcom Futurama. It originally aired on Comedy Central on August 29, 2012.

Plot
The characters are featured in a nature documentary show called "Mutual of Omicron's Wild Universe," divided into three segments. They appear as different animals in each segment with voice-over narration.

Part 1: The Salmon
The characters are depicted as salmon, with the exception of Zoidberg, who appears as a lobster. Fry and Leela, born in different rivers, meet after swimming out to sea, and Leela rejects Zapp Branigan and promises to mate with Fry when they come of age. However, since they must instinctually return to the rivers where they were hatched in order to mate, they are forced to separate. Before Zapp can fertilize Leela's eggs, he is caught and eaten by Brrr, a grizzly bear version of Lrrr. Fry jumps out of his river and over to Leela's, but is stuck on the land adjacent to it. He too is caught by Brrr, who reluctantly lets him go after the bear version of Ndnd argues with him over eating too much fish. Fry reaches Leela and fertilizes her eggs, and both die happily along with all the other salmon.

Part 2: The Pinta Island Tortoise
Professor Farnsworth, as a rare Pinta Island tortoise named Lonesome Hubert, is persuaded by his animal friends to find a mate so his species can continue. The female tortoise he is interested in lives on the other side of the island, an 18-month journey. Once Hubert arrives, he mistakenly begins to mate with a large, tortoise-shaped boulder until the real tortoise (resembling Mom) shows up and angrily knocks it down a hill. She has been waiting for Hubert, and the two mate but later part ways after she lays three eggs. Several months later, these hatch into tortoise versions of Walt, Larry and Igner and promptly fall down the hill, where the boulder rolls over and crushes them, leading to the species' extinction.

Part 3: The Elephant Seal
The alpha male of an elephant seal colony (Bender) mates freely with dozens of females, while the less virile males are unable to attract mates. Kif gets Amy's attention and begins to mate with her while Bender is distracted, but Bender discovers them and scares Kif away. Kif challenges Bender for dominance, only to be quickly crushed to death when they fight. However, the other lesser males have taken advantage of the fight and mated without Bender's knowledge, leading to the birth of several pups that look just like them.

Epilogue
Following the closing title screen of the documentary and a pitch for Mutual of Omicron ("Have you insured your planet?"), a fleet of spaceships destroys Earth.

Cultural references
 Mutual of Omicron's Wild Universe is a reference to the long-running nature documentary series Mutual of Omaha's Wild Kingdom; the logo containing Lrrr parodies Mutual of Omaha's corporate insignia.

Reception
Zack Handlen of The A.V. Club gave this episode a B+. Max Nicholson of IGN gave the episode an 8.5/10 "Great" rating.

The season finale had 1.365 million viewers and a 0.7 rating in the (18-49) demo.

References

External links
 
 

2012 American television episodes
Futurama (season 7) episodes
Fiction set around Omicron Persei